A Wuest type herringbone gear, invented by Swiss engineer Caspar Wüst-Kunz in early 1900s, is a special type of herringbone gear wherein "the teeth on opposite sides of the center line are staggered by an amount equal to one half the circular pitch". By having the teeth of two sides staggered, the gear wears more evenly at the slight cost of strength.

References 

Gears